The Männer-Turn-Verein von 1881 Ingolstadt or Men's Gymnastics Club of 1881 Ingolstadt is a general sports club in Ingolstadt, Bavaria. It was founded on 18 July 1881.

Until 2004, the club operated a football department but after a merger with local rival ESV Ingolstadt to form FC Ingolstadt 04 the footballers left for the new club. After a break of a number of years, MTV has returned to competitive football, restarting at the lowest possible level, the C-Klasse, in 2009.

History

Early years
While the club was formed in 1881, it did not begin to play football until 1905. In a Germany-wide split between gymnastics clubs and their football departments in 1924, the footballers became independent but this was revoked in 1933.

In the pre-Second World War days, the club lacked behind its local rival VfB Ingolstadt-Ringsee, the later ESV. While VfB at times played in the tier-one Bezirksliga Bayern, and later the Gauliga Bayern, MTV could not archive such heights until 1943, when a joined wartime side, the KSG Ingolstadt, briefly existed.

Post-Second World War
After World War II occupying Allied authorities ordered the dissolution of all organizations in Germany, including sporting associations. The club was re-founded as Städtischer SV Ingolstadt 1881 (English: City Sports Club Ingolstadt 1881). Their original name was restored in 1948.

The club qualified for the Landesliga Bayern (II) in 1946, where VfB already played. The league had restarted a year earlier as the tier below the Oberliga Süd. The league was then split into a northern and a southern group and MTV finished fourth out of eleven teams in the south. A repeat of this performance in the 1947–48 season meant, the team qualified for the now united Bavarian league. The club continued as a mid-table side in this league, but in 1951–52, the league had now been renamed Amateurliga Bayern and become a tier-three league, it was relegated after finishing 15th.

After initially failing to earn promotion from the 2. Amateurliga (IV) in 1953, the decision to return to two regional divisions for the Amateurliga Bayern meant, the MTV received one of the additional spots in the expanded league. In the following seasons, the team declined year-by-year and in 1957, it suffered another relegation from the Amateurliga. ESV followed MTV in this direction in 1960. But while ESV promptly returned and even marched through to the 2. Oberliga Süd, MTV failed to return to the Amateurliga Bayern.

1963 to 1978
The changes in the German football league system in 1963, foremost the introduction of the Bundesliga, saw the Bavarian football league system change, too. Below the Amateurliga Bayern, three regional Landesligen were formed. In the south, where MTV belonged to, the Landesliga Bayern-Süd was established, but the club failed to qualify for it and instead slipped down to the Bezirksliga Oberbayern-Nord (V), well below the clubs potential.

It recovered from this in 1965 and earned promotion to the Landesliga. In the 1965–66 Landesliga season, it won the championship straight away and finally returned to the third division after a ten-year absence. MTV could not maintain its Amateurliga status, however and promptly returned to the Landesliga, symptomatic for a club that would remain an elevator side between those two leagues for the next forty years, until the merger.

After a second place in 1968, it won another Landesliga title in 1969 and returned to the Amateurliga. It remained at this level for eight seasons, initially with good results but then gradually declining.

It spent only one season, 1976–77, in the Landesliga before returning straight again to the Amateurliga Bayern.

In retrospect, the era from 1976 to 1981 was to be the club's most successful, with a Landesliga  and a Bayernliga title and two seasons in the 2. Bundesliga Süd.

The team missed out on the championship in the Amateurliga Bayern in 1977–78 by one point to 1. FC Haßfurt. When Haßfurt decided for financial reasons not to take up its right for promotion, MTV was second in line and moved up to the 2. Bundesliga for 1978–79.

2. Bundesliga years
In this league, the club's first season was a success, finishing eleventh out of twenty teams, six points clear of relegation. At the end of the season, ESV had won what was now renamed Amateur Oberliga Bayern and also earned promotion to the second tier. This meant, two clubs from Ingolstadt where to be in the league for 1979–80.

While ESV finished 17th out of 21 clubs and remained in the league for another season, MTV came 19th and missed out on survival by three points to FSV Frankfurt. The club had to return to the Bayernliga.

1980 to 2004
The 1980–81 season was to see the club's only Bavarian championship, winning the Bayernliga. Unfortunately, no promotion for any tier-three champions was available this season because the 2. Bundesliga was reduced to a single division from its previous two regional ones. MTV had to enter the German amateur football championship instead, a small consolation for the club. While beating BFC Preußen Berlin in the first round, the team lost to FC St. Pauli in the semi-finals and finished the season empty handed apart from its Bayernliga title.

With the influx of former Bavarian tier-two teams in 1981, the league gained in quality but also became much harder to win. MTV finished fourth in 1981–82 and 1982–83 but then once more declined and in 1985, was relegated to the Landesliga once more. The 1984–85 season was the last to see two teams from Ingolstadt in the Amateur Oberliga Bayern, ESV was relegated in 1986 and never managed to regain this level of play.

MTV spent two seasons in the Landesliga before returning in 1987, having to beat FC Memmingen and VfB Helmbrechts in a promotion round to do so. The club archived another fourth place in the Bayernliga in the following season and remained a strong side in the league until 1991. In 1991–92, it once more suffered relegation.

In 1994, the introduction of the Regionalliga Süd meant that the club had a chance for promotion even though it had only finished third in the Landesliga. By beating SpVgg Weiden 4–2 after extra time, it succeeded. It was also the last season the Ingolstadt derby was to be played in league football, ESV was relegated from the Landesliga for good that season. Back in the Bayernliga, a last place finish send the club straight down again.

For MTV, five Landesliga'seasons followed, an eighth place in 1999 being the low point. The season after, the club won another second place and once more gained promotion through beating SpVgg Bayreuth and SpVgg Landshut in a promotion round.

After a sixth place in its first year back, the club came 17th in 2002 and went down to the Landesliga for the sixth time since 1963.

MTV Ingolstadt bowed out of league football with a fourth Landesliga Bayern-Süd title in 2004, thereby earning promotion to the Bayernliga for what would be FC Ingolstadt 04, the merger club.

Merger in 2004

On 5 February 2004, FC Ingolstadt 04 was formed out of the football departments of ESV and MTV. The two clubs however did not disappear, their other sports departments continue to exist. Peter Jackwerth, the first chairman of FCI 04 was the driving force behind the concentration of football in the city. On 23 April 2004, the new club held its first general meeting. The new club played its first match on 10 July 2004, a friendly against Borussia Mönchengladbach in front of over 4,000 spectators. While the first team of FCI took over MTV's place in the Oberliga Bayern (IV), the second team took up ESV's spot in the Bezirksoberliga Oberbayern (VI).

MTV itself did not field a senior football team any more for a number of years but it continued to operate a small youth department. Eventually, in 2009, the club reentered a senior team in the tier-thirteen C-Klasse Donau-Isar, won the league and earned promotion to the B-Klasse, followed by promotion to the A-Klasse a year later. After four seasons in the A-Klasse the club won promotion to the Kreisklasse in 2015. MTV dropped back to the A-Klasse in 2017 after losing all 26 games, thereby finishing last out of 14 teams.

ESV survived its insolvency, which it had to declare in July 2004 and which was one of the main reasons the new club was formed.

Honours
The club's honours:

League
 Oberliga Bayern (III)
 Champions: 1981
 Runners-up: 1978
 Landesliga Bayern-Süd (IV)
 Champions: (4) 1966, 1969, 1977, 2004
 Runners-up: (2) 1968, 2000
 2. Amateurliga Oberbayern A (IV)
 Champions: 1953
 Bezirksliga Oberbayern-Nord (V)
 Champions: 1965
 Runners-up: 1964
 A-Klasse Donau/Isar 2 West (X)
 Champions: 2015
 B-Klasse Donau-Isar 2 Nord (XII)
 Champions: 2011
 C-Klasse Donau-Isar 2 Süd (XIII)
 Champions: 2010

Cup
 Bavarian Cup
 Runners-up: (2) 1947, 1950

Youth
 Bavarian Under 19 championship
 Runners-up: (3) 1965, 2000, 2001
 Bavarian Under 15 championship
 Runners-up: 2001

Recent seasons
The recent season-by-season performance of the club:

With the introduction of the Bezirksoberligas in 1988 as the new fifth tier, below the Landesligas, all leagues below dropped one tier. With the introduction of the Regionalligas in 1994 and the 3. Liga in 2008 as the new third tier, below the 2. Bundesliga, all leagues below dropped one tier. With the establishment of the Regionalliga Bayern as the new fourth tier in Bavaria in 2012 the Bayernliga was split into a northern and a southern division, the number of Landesligas expanded from three to five and the Bezirksoberligas abolished. All leagues from the Bezirksligas onwards were elevated one tier.

DFB-Pokal appearances
The club has qualified for the first round of the German Cup three times:

The Ingolstadt derby

The derby was played as high up as the 2nd Bundesliga but more common in the Oberliga and Landesliga. In 1979–80, the two clubs met for their only encounters in professional football:

Source:

Departments
MTV currently features 16 sports and 2 cultural departments:

 Basketball
 Beach volleyball
 Fencing
 Football (Soccer)
 Physical fitness
 Handball
 Judo
 Karate and Kobudo
 Athletics
 Wrestling
 Chess
 Skiing
 Tennis
 Table tennis
 Gymnastics
 Volleyball
 Schäfflergilde (traditional dance)
 "Schanzer Volksbuehne" (amateur dramatic society)

References

External links
 Homepage of MTV 1881 Ingolstadt
 Homepage of MTV 1881 Ingolstadt's Judo division
 Homepage of MTV 1881 Ingolstadt's Athletics division
 FC Ingolstadt 04 at Weltfussball.de
 MTV Ingolstadt at Weltfussball.de
 Abseits guide to German soccer – MTV Ingolstadt
 Das deutsche Fußball-Archiv historical German domestic league tables 
 Homepage of "Schanzer Volksbühne" within MTV 1881 Ingolstadt

Football clubs in Germany
Football clubs in Bavaria
Multi-sport clubs in Germany
Association football clubs established in 1905
Sports clubs established in 1881
MTV
Football in Upper Bavaria
1881 establishments in Germany
MTV Ingolstadt
Athletics clubs in Germany
2. Bundesliga clubs